The 1997 Los Angeles Dodgers season was the 108th for the franchise in Major League Baseball, and their 40th season in Los Angeles, California. The Dodgers were competitive all season long before finally fading down the stretch; the Dodgers finished in second place behind their longtime rivals, San Francisco Giants, in the Western Division of the National League. The edition of the Dodgers had, for the second time in team history (and for the first time since 1977), four players crack the 30 home run barrier: Mike Piazza led the team with 40, Eric Karros and Todd Zeile hit 31 each, and Raul Mondesi hit 30.

Offseason
December 9, 1996: Acquired Jeff Berblinger from the Detroit Tigers for Deivi Cruz and Juan Hernaiz

Regular season

Season standings

Record vs. opponents

Opening Day lineup

Notable Transactions
August 9, 1997: Acquired Hal Garrett from the Pittsburgh Pirates for Eddie Williams.
August 12, 1997: Acquired Otis Nixon from the Toronto Blue Jays for Bobby Cripps.
August 18, 1997: Acquired Eric Young from the Colorado Rockies for Pedro Astacio.
August 27, 1997: Acquired Darren Lewis from the Chicago White Sox for Chad Fonville.
September 3, 1997: Chip Hale was released by the Los Angeles Dodgers.

Roster

Starting Pitchers stats
Note: G = Games pitched; GS = Games started; IP = Innings pitched; W/L = Wins/Losses; ERA = Earned run average; BB = Walks allowed; SO = Strikeouts; CG = Complete games

Relief Pitchers stats
Note: G = Games pitched; GS = Games started; IP = Innings pitched; W/L = Wins/Losses; ERA = Earned run average; BB = Walks allowed; SO = Strikeouts; SV = Saves

Batting Stats
Note: Pos = Position; G = Games played; AB = At bats; Avg. = Batting average; R = Runs scored; H = Hits; HR = Home runs; RBI = Runs batted in; SB = Stolen bases

1997 Awards
1997 Major League Baseball All-Star Game
Mike Piazza starter
Gold Glove Award
Raúl Mondesí
Silver Slugger Award
Mike Piazza
TSN National League All-Star
Mike Piazza
NL Player of the Month
Mike Piazza (July 1997)
Mike Piazza (August 1997)
NL Player of the Week
Mike Piazza (Aug. 25–31)

Farm system 

Teams in BOLD won League Championships

Major League Baseball Draft

The Dodgers selected 71 players in this draft. Of those, seven of them would eventually play Major League baseball. They received an extra supplemental pick in the second round as a result of losing free agent Delino DeShields.

The first round pick was first baseman Glenn Davis from Vanderbilt University. In eight seasons in the minors, he never advanced past AA. He hit .242 in 802 minor league games with 108 homers and 431 RBI. With their second round pick, the Dodgers picked shortstop Chase Utley from Polytechnic High School in Long Beach, California. However, Utley refused to sign and went to college instead. He was eventually a first round pick of the Philadelphia Phillies in 2000 and became a multi-time All-Star.

None of the players signed by the Dodgers in this draft class had a significant major league career.

References

External links 
1997 Los Angeles Dodgers uniform
Los Angeles Dodgers official web site
Baseball-Reference season page
Baseball Almanac season page

Los Angeles Dodgers seasons
Los Angeles Dodgers
1997 in sports in California